The Nabatieh District is a district in the Nabatieh Governorate of Lebanon. The capital of the district is Nabatieh.

Villages

Qaaqaait Al Jisr
Ansar
Aedsheet
Ain Qana
Ain Boswar
Aldawair
Arab Saleem
Chouqin
Der Al Zahrani
Doueir
Ebba
Habboush
Harouf
Jarjouh
Jbaa
Jibcheet
Kfarfila
Kfour, Nabatieh
Kfarjouz
Kafra
Kfar Remen
Kfarsseer
Houmeen
Kfar Tebneet
Marwania
Mayfadoun
Schhour
Zifta
Kaoutariyet Al Siyad
Toul
Nabatiye al-Fawqa
Sharqia
Zawtar el charkiyeh
Zibdeen
Braikeh 
Qusayba

External links
Destination Lebanon - Regional Promenade Brochure for the South: Al-Nabatieh

 
Districts of Lebanon